The Arena Zabrze, also known as the Stadion im. Ernesta Pohla (Ernest Pohl Stadium), is a football stadium in Zabrze, Poland. It is the home ground of Górnik Zabrze. Originally constructed in 1934, it is currently in the process of complete rebuilding.

History
Built in 1934 as Adolf-Hitler-Kampfbahn (en: Adolf Hitler Arena), this name was used until 1946. In 2005 it was given the new name of Ernest Pohl, a famous Polish footballer who played for Górnik Zabrze. In 2016 the stadium was named "Arena Zabrze", although the formal name is still "Ernest Pohl Stadium".

New stadium
A first stage of renovation was approved for 192.5 million złoty, and is to hold 24,563 spectators. Three stands were opened on February 21, 2016. Completed stadium will have capacity of 31,871.

See also
 Ernest Pohl
 List of football stadiums in Poland

References

  Stadion im. Ernesta Pohla

External links
 Stadium guide
  Visualizations

Górnik Zabrze
Zabrze
Buildings and structures in Zabrze
Sports venues in Silesian Voivodeship